Anu Välba (born 14 May 1974) is an Estonian TV and radio host.

She graduated from Tallinn University in television directing in 1998 but has been working as a hostess instead. Her credits include the TV morning programme "Terevisioon", weekly "Paar", "Hommik Anuga" and daily "Ringvaade", all but one co-hosted with Marko Reikop. She was also involved with Eurovision Song Contest 2002 where she did off-screen editing for video postcards shown between the competing songs.

On the radio, she has co-worked for the programmes of Vikerraadio and Raadio 2.

References

1974 births
Living people
Estonian journalists
Estonian women journalists
Estonian television personalities
Tallinn University alumni
People from Pärnu County